The intercostobrachial nerve is the name applied to the lateral cutaneous branch of the second intercostal nerve. It arises anterior to the long thoracic nerve. It provides sensory innervation to the skin of the axilla, and a variable region of the medial side of the upper arm.

Anatomy
The lateral cutaneous branch of the second intercostal nerve does not divide like other intercostal nerves into an anterior and a posterior branch.

Course 
It pierces the intercostalis externus muscle and the serratus anterior muscle, crosses the axilla to the medial side of the arm, and joins with a filament from the medial brachial cutaneous nerve. It then pierces the fascia, and supplies the skin of the upper half of the medial and posterior part of the arm, communicating with the posterior brachial cutaneous branch of the radial nerve.

Relations 
The size of the intercostobrachial nerve is in inverse relationship to that of the medial brachial cutaneous nerve.

Variation 
An additional intercostobrachial nerve is frequently given off from the lateral cutaneous branch of the third intercostal nerves; it supplies filaments to the axilla and medial side of the arm.

Clinical significance 
It is often the source of referred cardiac pain.

The intercostobrachial nerve is sometimes divided in axillary node clearance (ANC), such as that done for breast cancer surgery which requires the removal of the axillary nodes. Sensation to the cutaneous region supplied by the nerve is affected.

See also
 Cutaneous innervation of the upper limbs

Additional images

References

External links
  - "Axillary Region: Nerves"
 

Spinal nerves